General Eaton may refer to:

Amos Beebe Eaton (1806–1877), Union Army brigadier general and brevet major general
Joseph Horace Eaton (1815–1896), Union Army brevet brigadier general
Lewis Eaton (1790–1857), New York State Miltia brigadier general
Paul Eaton (born 1950), U.S. Army major general
Thomas Eaton (general) (c. 1739–1809), North Carolina State Militia brigadier general in the American Revolutionary War